The Soreq Applied Research Accelerator Facility (SARAF) is a multi-user and versatile particle accelerator facility. It is on a proton/deuteron RF superconducting linear accelerator, with variable energy (5-40 MeV) and a continuous wave (CW) high ion current (0.04-5 mA), and located at the Soreq Nuclear Research Center.

The SARAF high-intensity superconducting linear particle accelerator for light ions belongs to a new generation of particle accelerators. The high ion current generates an unprecedented amount of fast neutrons and radioactive nuclei, that may be used to explore rare nuclear reactions, produce new types of radiopharmaceuticals and more. Moderated neutrons can be used for non-destructive tests with similar resolution and contrast as performed in reactors.
Accelerator facilities such as SARAF are designed to produce enough neutrons to perform the functions that are today possible only at research nuclear reactors, such as IRR1 at Soreq. Since accelerators do not use fissile materials, they are expected to be a welcome replacement of research reactors, as they do not pose a proliferation or an environmental concern, and they have much better public acceptance than nuclear reactors.
The SARAF Phase-I accelerator was built by ACCEL Instruments (now RI Research Instruments GmbH). The novel acceleration technology proved the feasibility of the construction of the full SARAF Project. Until 2012 (since 2010), SARAF is the first and only superconducting accelerator in the world to demonstrate CW acceleration of mA-range proton beams.

Research and development programs at SARAF
The research and development programs at SARAF include the following subjects:
Particle physics - high statistics measurements of properties and beta decay studies of light radioactive nuclei, to enable probing the limits of the standard model for Elementary Particles or set new accuracy limits to known physics (due to a worldwide unique possibility to produce high yields of light radioisotopes).
Nuclear astrophysics - measurement of rare cross sections associated with nucleo-synthesis in the core of giant stars.
Material science - fusion reactor material radiation damage study with a neutron spectrum similar to d-t fusion, of small components.
Novel therapy methods - accelerator based boron neutron capture therapy of cancer (BNCT) using high therapeutic gain epi-thermal neutrons for malignant tumors therapy.
R&D of radiopharmaceuticals - utilization of the high current and high power targets of SARAF for production of new radiopharmaceuticals for therapy and diagnostics.
Neutron radiography and diffractometry - the high current of SARAF enables generation of thermal neutrons in a quantity, which enables radiography and diffractometry similar to that performed in nuclear reactors.
Fast neutron based basic and applied research - SARAF can deliver to user a unique fast neutron spectrum that is not available in reactors or elsewhere accelerator facilities to open new scientific discipline in light radioactive nuclei studies, radiation damage and more.

Education opportunities and challenges

SARAF is intended to be an Israeli national facility, to be used by Soreq's researchers, the Israeli academy and institutes and universities from all over the world, in order to attract, train and educate a new generation of nuclear physicists and engineers. 
Fruitful collaboration with Israeli research institutes and universities, as with world leading accelerator laboratories, turned SARAF to an eminent key player in the world's accelerator community. Newly developed components from other accelerator projects are being tested at SARAF and in addition, SARAF scientists are sharing their knowledge and expertise with worldwide accelerator programs.
The central role of SARAF in the linear accelerator community lead to Soreq NRC being host for the 26th bi-annual LINAC conference, LINAC'12, at Tel Aviv, Israel in September 2012.
Furthermore, SARAF has already become a major facility for students and young researchers, to perform their graduate studies and practice in nuclear physics and nuclear engineering. 
Over the last 8 years, approximately 10 graduate students, 15 undergraduate students and 5 post-doctorate fellows performed research projects associated with SARAF.

The construction of SARAF
The construction of SARAF was initiated by Soreq NRC on 2003 and is divided into two phases:

Phase I - A proof of the innovative technologies that are required for constructing the SARAF accelerator. Achievements of Phase I include the first acceleration of 1 mA CW, 4 MeV proton beams through a HWR based superconducting accelerator, routinely delivered to targets and beam dumps and low duty cycle acceleration of 5 MeV deuterons. 
Low energy acceleration of such beams is crucial for all present and future high intensity linear accelerator projects worldwide.

Phase II – The completion of the accelerator to its specified performance, construction of a target hall, target stations and all necessary infrastructures. Phase II is planned to commence at 2013. The Phase II accelerator is foreseen to be completed by 2018 and the target hall and stations are planned to be operational by the end of the decade.
Soreq is planning to construct the Phase II accelerator in collaboration with a world leading accelerator laboratory.

References

Particle accelerators